Oreste Ravanello (25 August 1871 in Venice – 2 July 1938 in Padua) was an Italian composer and organist.

Ravanello studied organ and composition at the Liceo Musicale in Venice before he was appointed organist of the San Marco Cathedral at the age of seventeen. He also taught at the (now Benedetto Marcello) Conservatory of Music in Venice, and then became director of Instituto Musicale in Padua (now the "Cesare Pollini" Conservatory of Music).

Activity 

He became a well-known recitalist well known for his improvisations. He was above all remembered for his compositions which are especially intended for the church: ca. 30 Masses, Te Deums etc. but also numerous works for organ and piano. His language is late romantic and melodious.

Works 
CORALE FANTASIA, OP. 7
QUATTRO PEZZI FACILI, OP. 12
 1. Preludio
 2. Pastorale
 3. Fughetta dorica
 4. Elevazione
SETTE TRII, OP. 25
 1. O crux, ave
 2. Qui odit animam suam
 3. Lucis creator optime
 4. Corale
 5. Corale
 6. Corale
 7. Larghetto pastorale
 SEI PEZZI, OP. 27
 1. Praeludium super Agnus Dei
 2. Praeludium super Te Lucis
 3. Meditazione super Ave Regina Cœlorum
 4. Elevazione o Comunione super Alma Redemptoris
 5. Interludium super Salve Regina
 6. Postludium super Regina Coeli
SETTE CORALI, OP. 29
 1. O quam metuendus est
 2. Adoro Te devote
 3. Agnus Dei
 4. Stabat Mater
 5. Salve Regina
 6. Inviolata
 7.Te Deum
 QUATTRO PEZZI PER GRAND’ORGANO, OP. 39
 1. Preludio romantico
 2. Musette – Méditation
 3. Elevazione
 4. Marcia eucaristica
 TRE PEZZI PER GRAND’ORGANO, OP. 40
 1. Prélude gothique
 2. Chanson nordique
 3. Toccata
 SEI PEZZI PER GRAND’ORGANO, OP. 50
 1. Preludio in forma di studio
 2. Preghiera
 3. Musette
 4. Elegia
 5. Fughetta
 6. Christus resurrexit
 SCENE AL PRESEPIO, Op. 129 (1935), for organ or harmonium
 1. I Magi, preludio pastorale
 2. Notte di Natale, cantilena
 3. Campane all'alba, pastorale
MYSTICA, OP. 133
 1. Noël
 2. La Madeleine et le Divin Jardinier
 3. Gesù spira sulla croce

External links 
 
 
 
 .
 Oreste Ravanello in memoriam 1938/2018

1871 births
1938 deaths
19th-century classical composers
19th-century Italian male musicians
19th-century organists
20th-century classical composers
20th-century Italian composers
20th-century Italian male musicians
20th-century organists
Italian classical composers
Italian classical musicians
Italian classical organists
Italian male classical composers
Italian Romantic composers
Male classical organists